Phillip Carr (born October 20, 1995) is an American basketball player.

College career
He played his first season at Mohawk Valley Community College in Oneida County, New York, from where he transferred to Williston State College in Williston, North Dakota. Finally in 2015 he was transferred to Division I of the NCAA, to the Morgan State University Bears, where he played three seasons in which he averaged 13.4 points, 8.5 rebounds, 1.2 assists and 1.1 steals per game. In 2017 he was named the Mid-Eastern Athletic Conference Defensive Player of the Year, and that season and the following he was included in the conference's best quintet.

References

External links
Profile at Eurobasket.com
Profile at Proballers.com

1995 births
Living people
American expatriate basketball people in Italy
American expatriate basketball people in Slovakia
American expatriate basketball people in Sweden
American men's basketball players
Basketball players from New York City
BK Iskra Svit players
Cleveland Charge players
Jämtland Basket players
Junior college men's basketball players in the United States
Morgan State Bears men's basketball players
Norrköping Dolphins players
Westchester Knicks players